Drymoea is a genus of moths in the family Geometridae erected by Francis Walker in 1854. This genus was originally proposed in the family Arctiidae, but was later transferred to the Geometridae. Some other genera (Sangala, Melanoptilon, Nelo and Nelopsis) were then included in this genus. The genus is confined to the Neotropical realm.

Species
In alphabetical order:

References

External links
  With images.

Ennominae
Geometridae of South America
Moths of South America